George Muncey (27 December 1835 — 14 March 1883) was an English first-class cricketer.

Muncey was born in December 1835 at Mildenhall, Suffolk. Muncey made played first-class cricket for the Cambridge Town Club (also known as Cambridgeshire), making his debut in 1860 against Cambridge University at Fenner's. He played first-class cricket for Cambridgeshire representative sides until 1866, having made ten first-class appearances. An all-rounder, he scored 197 runs at an average of 10.36, with a highest score of 37; as a right-arm underarm slow bowler, he took 10 wickets at a bowling average of 19.22, and best figures of 4 for 25. Outside of cricket, Muncey found himself in trouble with the law on several occasions. He was summoned by the Board of Guardians of the Cambridge Poor Law Union in April 1868 for neglecting his three children. In the same month he was charged with assaulting a Thomas Lee. In January 1869, while on bail for another offence, he was charged with stealing three gallons of brandy and two bottles. In July of the same year, he was charged with assaulting fellow cricketer Frederick Bell following a disagreement over goods received; Muncey admitted the offence and paid a fine. Muncey died at Cambridge in March 1883.

References

External links

1835 births
1883 deaths
People from Mildenhall, Suffolk
English cricketers
Cambridge Town Club cricketers
19th-century English criminals
Criminals from Cambridgeshire
English people convicted of assault